Döğmeci, Nallıhan is a village in the District of Nallıhan, Ankara Province, Turkey.

References

Villages in Nallıhan District